The name Fefa was used for three tropical cyclones in the Eastern Pacific Ocean.
 Hurricane Fefa (1979) – remained well at sea.
 Tropical Storm Fefa (1985) – moved parallel to the Mexican coastline.
 Hurricane Fefa (1991) – eventually impacted Hawaii after being downgraded to a Tropical Depression.

The name Fefa was retired in the spring of 1992, and replaced with Felicia in the 1997 season.

Pacific hurricane set index articles